Hassle Records is an independent record label that was created by Chris Baker in 2005.

Artists
Current
 Petrol Girls
 Under the Influence
 Lonely the Brave
 August Burns Red
 Cancer Bats
 The James Cleaver Quintet
 The Get Up Kids
 Pagan
 Senses Fail
 Thousand Foot Krutch 
 Turbowolf
 The Used
 Casey
 Brutus
 Swedish Death Candy (Acid Rock from London/Seoul/Bari)
 Phoxjaw

Former
 Alexisonfire (United Kingdom only)
 Attack! Attack!
 Blitz Kids
 Canterbury
 Four Year Strong
 Juliette Lewis
 Rolo Tomassi (Now on Destination Moon)
 Trash Talk
 We Are the Ocean
 65daysofstatic
Fact

References

External links

 
British independent record labels
Alternative rock record labels
Record labels established in 2005
Hardcore record labels